Amborella is a monotypic genus of understory shrubs or small trees endemic to the main island, Grande Terre, of New Caledonia in the southwest Pacific Ocean. The genus is the only member of the family Amborellaceae and the order Amborellales and contains a single species, Amborella trichopoda. Amborella is of great interest to plant systematists because molecular phylogenetic analyses consistently place it as the sister group to all other flowering plants.

Description
It bears alternate, simple evergreen leaves without stipules.

Amborella has xylem tissue that differs from that of most other flowering plants. The xylem of Amborella contains only tracheids; vessel elements are absent. Xylem of this form has long been regarded as a primitive feature of flowering plants.

The species is dioecious. This means that each plant produces either male flowers (meaning that they have functional stamens) or female flowers (flowers with functional carpels), but not both. At any one time, a dioecious plant produces only functionally staminate or functionally carpellate flowers. Staminate ("male") Amborella flowers do not have carpels, whereas the carpellate ("female") flowers have non-functional "staminodes", structures resembling stamens in which no pollen develops. Plants may change from one reproductive morphology to the other. In one study, seven cuttings from a staminate plant produced, as expected, staminate flowers at their first flowering, but three of the seven produced carpellate flowers at their second flowering.

The small, creamy white flowers are arranged in inflorescences borne in the axils of foliage leaves. The inflorescences have been described as cymes, with up to three orders of branching, each branch being terminated by a flower.  Each flower is subtended by bracts. The bracts transition into a perianth of undifferentiated tepals. The tepals typically are arranged in a spiral, but sometimes are whorled at the periphery.

There are 1 to 3 (or rarely 0) well-differentiated staminodes and a spiral of 4 to 8 free (apocarpous) carpels. Carpels bear green ovaries; they lack a style. They contain a single ovule with the micropyle directed downwards. Staminate flowers are approximately 4 to 5 mm in diameter, with 6 to 15 tepals. These flowers bear 10 to 21 spirally arranged stamens, which become progressively smaller toward the center. The innermost may be sterile, amounting to staminodes. The stamens bear triangular anthers on short broad filaments. An anther consists of four pollen sacs, two on each side, with a small sterile central connective. The anthers have connective tips with small bumps and may be covered with secretions. These features suggest that, as with other basal angiosperms, there is a high degree of developmental plasticity.

Typically, 1 to 3 carpels per flower develop into fruit. The fruit is an ovoid red drupe (approximately 5 to 7 mm long and 5 mm wide) borne on a short (1 to 2 mm) stalk. The remains of the stigma can be seen at the tip of the fruit. The skin is papery, surrounding a thin fleshy layer containing a red juice. The inner pericarp is lignified and surrounds the single seed. The embryo is small and surrounded by copious endosperm.

Taxonomy

History 

The Cronquist system, of 1981, classified the family:
 Order Laurales
 Subclass Magnoliidae
 Class Magnoliopsida [=dicotyledons]
 Division Magnoliophyta [=angiosperms]

The Thorne system (1992) classified it:
 Order Magnoliales
 Superorder Magnolianae
 Subclass Magnoliideae [=dicotyledons]
 Class Magnoliopsida [=angiosperms]

The Dahlgren system classified it:
 Order Laurales
 Superorder Magnolianae
 Subclass Magnoliideae [=dicotyledons],
 Class Magnoliopsida [=angiosperms].

Modern classification 
Amborella is the only genus in the family Amborellaceae.  The APG II system recognized this family, but left it unplaced at order rank due to uncertainty about its relationship to the family Nymphaeaceae. In the more recent APG systems, APG III and APG IV, the Amborellaceae comprise the monotypic order Amborellales at the base of the angiosperm phylogeny.

Phylogeny
Currently plant systematists accept Amborella trichopoda as the most basal lineage in the clade of angiosperms.  In systematics the term "basal" describes a lineage that diverges near the base of a phylogeny, and thus earlier than other lineages. Since Amborella is apparently basal among the flowering plants, the features of early flowering plants can be inferred by comparing derived traits shared by the main angiosperm lineage but not present in Amborella. These traits are presumed to have evolved after the divergence of the Amborella lineage.

One early 20th century idea of "primitive" (i.e. ancestral) floral traits in angiosperms, accepted until relatively recently, is the Magnolia blossom model. This envisions flowers with numerous parts arranged in spirals on an elongated, cone-like receptacle rather than the small numbers of parts in distinct whorls of more derived flowers.

In a study designed to clarify relationships between well-studied model plants such as Arabidopsis thaliana, and the basal angiosperms Amborella, Nuphar (Nymphaeaceae), Illicium, the monocots, and more derived angiosperms (eudicots), chloroplast genomes using cDNA and expressed sequence tags for floral genes, the cladogram shown below was generated.

This hypothesized relationship of the extant seed plants places Amborella as the sister taxon to all other angiosperms, and shows the gymnosperms as a monophyletic group sister to the angiosperms. It supports the theory that Amborella branched off from the main lineage of angiosperms before the ancestors of any other living angiosperms. There is however some uncertainty about the relationship between the Amborellaceae and the Nymphaeales: one theory is that the Amborellaceae alone are the monophyletic sister to the extant angiosperms; another proposes that the Amborellaceae and Nymphaeales form a clade that is the sister group to all other extant angiosperms.

Because of its evolutionary position at the base of the flowering plant clade, there was support for sequencing the complete genome of Amborella trichopoda to serve as a reference for evolutionary studies. In 2010, the US National Science Foundation began a genome sequencing effort in Amborella, and the draft genome sequence was posted on the project website in December 2013.

Genomic and evolutionary considerations 
Amborella is of great interest to plant systematists because molecular phylogenetic analyses consistently place it at or near the base of the flowering plant lineage. That is, the Amborellaceae represent a line of flowering plants that diverged very early on (more than 130 million years ago) from all the other extant species of flowering plants, and, among extant flowering plants, is the sister group to the other flowering plants. Comparing characteristics of this basal angiosperm, other flowering plants and fossils may provide clues about how flowers first appeared—what Darwin called the "abominable mystery". This position is consistent with a number of conservative characteristics of its physiology and morphology; for example, the wood of Amborella lacks the vessels characteristic of most flowering plants. Further, the female gametophyte of Amborella is even more reduced than normal female angiosperm gametophyte.

Amborella, being an understory plant in the wild, is commonly in intimate contact with shade- and moisture-dependent organisms such as algae, lichens and mosses. In those circumstances, some horizontal gene transfer between Amborella and such associated species is not surprising in principle, but the scale of such transfer has caused considerable surprise. Sequencing the Amborella mitochondrial genome revealed that for every gene of its own origin, it contains about six versions from the genomes of an assortment of the plants and algae growing with or upon it. The evolutionary and physiological significance of this is not as yet clear, nor in particular is it clear whether the horizontal gene transfer has anything to do with the apparent stability and conservatism of the species.

Ecology
Amborella is typically dioecious, but has been known to change sex in cultivation. Amborella has a mixed pollination system, relying on both insect pollinators and wind.

Conservation
The islands of New Caledonia are a biodiversity hot-spot, preserving many early diverging lineages of plants, of which Amborella is but one. This preservation has been ascribed to climate stability during and since the Tertiary, stability that has permitted the continued survival of tropical forests on New Caledonia. In contrast, drought conditions dominated the Australian climate towards the end of the Tertiary. Current threats to biodiversity in New Caledonia include fires, mining, agriculture, invasion by introduced species, urbanization and global warming. The importance of conserving Amborella has been dramatically stated by Pillon: "The disappearance of Amborella trichopoda would imply the disappearance of a genus, a family and an entire order, as well as the only witness to at least 140 million years of evolutionary history." Conservation strategies targeted on relict species are recommended, both preserving a diversity of habitats in New Caledonia and ex situ conservation in cultivation.

References

Further reading

External links 

 The Amborella Genome Sequencing Project 
 Amborellaceae  in L. Watson and M.J. Dallwitz (1992 onwards). The families of flowering plants: descriptions, illustrations, identification, information retrieval.  via Description language for taxonomy 
 Ancient plant provides clues to evolutionary mystery (National Science Foundation)
 National Tropical Botanical Garden (Hawaii, United States), article with detailed photos of plants in cultivation
 Nova "First Flower" (transcript)
 NCBI Taxonomy Browser

Monotypic angiosperm genera
Endemic flora of New Caledonia
Plants described in 1873
Taxa named by Henri Ernest Baillon
Dioecious plants